Walking into Clarksdale is the only studio album by Jimmy Page and Robert Plant, both formerly of English rock band Led Zeppelin. It was released by Atlantic Records on 21 April 1998. The album was recorded and mixed by Steve Albini at Abbey Road Studios.

The album debuted on the Billboard's Billboard 200 album chart at No. 8, while reaching No. 3 on the UK Album Chart. The single "Most High" was awarded a Grammy Award for Best Hard Rock Performance in 1999, and reached No. 1 on Billboard's Mainstream Rock Tracks chart and No. 26 in the UK.

Plant re-recorded the song "Please Read the Letter" with Alison Krauss for their 2007 collaboration album Raising Sand. This re-recording won the Record of the Year award at the 2009 Grammy Awards. "House of Love" was later re-recorded with different lyrics by Robert Plant and the Sensational Space Shifters for their 2014 studio album Lullaby and the Ceaseless Roar.

The title of the album refers to Clarksdale, Mississippi, a town in the Mississippi Delta considered to be the birthplace of blues music.

Background and recording 
Following their successful No Quarter tour and subsequent live album release, Jimmy Page and Robert Plant began writing Walking into Clarksdale. For the new record, Page and Plant pursued a more stripped-down sound, eschewing the heavy orchestration of their live performances in favor of a more traditional four-piece band. The initial demos for the album were written by Page on a Harmony H1260 Sovereign guitar, first used during the recording of Led Zeppelin III.

The band met at RAK Studios in August 1997 where they recorded "Burning Up" and "Shining in the Light". Shortly after, the band left RAK for Abbey Road's EMI Number Two Studio, where they recorded the rest of the album over the course of 35 days in August and September. Page characterized the band's approach as "minimalistic", stating that the band wanted to avoid "embellishments for the sake of it" and that "every note was played in its place to mean something."

The album was recorded and mixed by Steve Albini, known for producing Nirvana's final album In Utero. Plant reported he had long admired Albini's music and recording techniques. Each song was recorded in a single take, with the full band live in the studio, with the exception of guitar layering on the title track and string and keyboard overdubs on "Upon a Golden Horse" and "Most High".

Release
Walking into Clarksdale was released internationally on 20 April 1998, and in North America on 21 April to widespread critical acclaim. The album's launch was preceded by the release of "Most High" as the album's first single on 30 March 1998. "Most High" debuted at No. 10 on Billboard's Mainstream Rock chart.

"Shining in the Light" was released as the album's second single on 30 May 1998.

Atlantic Records promoted the album extensively, with advertising on major U.S. cable channels and national print publications like Rolling Stone, interviews booked on nearly every major talk show, and a "substantial radio buy" in the top 20 radio markets. In addition to more traditional promotional channels, Atlantic signed a deal with Ticketmaster – a first for the label – to upsell the album directly to customers who ordered tickets to the 1998 tour.

The album cover, designed by Martin Callomon, features photography by Anton Corbijn, best known for his work with U2 and Depeche Mode.

Tour 
To promote Walking into Clarksdale, Page and Plant kicked off 1998's "Walking into Everywhere" Tour. The tour, consisting of three tours of Eastern Europe, North America, and Western Europe, consisted of 97 tour dates and featured a mix of both new material and Led Zeppelin classics. The band's concert in Bucharest, Romania was professionally filmed for a cancelled home video release, and parts of the concert were broadcast live on the MTV special “Live from the 10 Spot” to promote the album.

Three additional tour legs in Japan, Australia, and South America were planned for 1999. However, following a final appearance in Paris on 10 December 1998 at the Amnesty International “The Struggle Continues…” concert, Robert Plant dissolved the partnership and the planned 1999 tour was cancelled.

Track listing
All songs by Jimmy Page, Robert Plant, Charlie Jones, and Michael Lee.

"Shining in the Light" – 4:01
"When the World Was Young" – 6:13
"Upon a Golden Horse" – 3:52
"Blue Train" – 6:45
"Please Read the Letter" – 4:21
"Most High" – 5:36
"Heart in Your Hand" – 3:50
"Walking into Clarksdale" – 5:18
"Burning Up" – 5:21
"When I Was a Child" – 5:45
"House of Love" – 5:35
"Sons of Freedom" – 4:08

Japanese bonus track
"Whiskey from the Glass" – 3:01

Note
"Most High" and "Shining in the Light" were released as singles, with a music video for the former. "Most High" was also featured as a CD single with the B-side "The Window".

Personnel
Band members
Jimmy Page – acoustic and electric guitars, mandolin, co-production
Robert Plant – vocals, co-production
Charlie Jones – bass guitar, percussion, mixing on "Upon a Golden Horse"
Michael Lee – drums, percussion

Additional musicians
Lynton Naiff – string arrangements on "Upon a Golden Horse"
Ed Shearmur – programming and string pads on "Most High"
Tim Whelan – keyboards on "Most High"

Production
Steve Albini – engineering, mixing, recording technician
Paul Hicks – assistant engineering
Phil Andrews – mixing on "Upon a Golden Horse"
Anton Corbijn – photography
Martin "Cally" Callomon – design

Charts

Album

Year-end

Certifications

References

1998 debut albums
Albums produced by Jimmy Page
Page and Plant albums
Atlantic Records albums
Mercury Records albums
Clarksdale, Mississippi